The 1999 Berlin Thunder season was the inaugural season for the franchise in the NFL Europe League (NFLEL). The team was led by head coach Wes Chandler, and played its home games at Jahn-Sportpark in Berlin, Germany. They finished the regular season in sixth place with a record of three wins and seven losses.

Although the Thunder replaced the England Monarchs for this season, the only player from the 1998 roster to return for the new team was outside linebacker Scott Fields.

Personnel

Staff

Roster

Schedule

Standings

Game summaries

Week 4: at Amsterdam Admirals

Week 5: vs Amsterdam Admirals

Notes

References

Berlin Thunder seasons